Sadegh Gashni (born August 28, 1986) is an Iranian football midfielder, who plays for Aluminium Arak in the Azadegan League.

Career
Gashni joined Paykan in Summer 2012 after a season playing in Iranjavan.

Club career statistics

References

External links
Sadegh Gashni at PersianLeague.com

Iranian footballers
Association football midfielders
Paykan F.C. players
1986 births
Living people